Ibrokhimkhalil Yuldoshev (born 14 February 2001) is an Uzbekistani footballer who plays as a left back for Russian club Pari NN and Uzbekistan national football team.

Career

Club
On 26 August 2021, Yuldoshev signed with Russian Premier League club FC Nizhny Novgorod.
On 20 April 2022, Yuldoshev signed a new three-year contract with Nizhny Novgorod.

International
He made his debut for the senior national team of Uzbekistan on 3 September 2020 in a friendly match against Tajikistan.

Career statistics

Club

International team

Statistics accurate as of match played 15 November 2021.

International goalsScores and results list Uzbekistan's goal tally first.''

Honours

Club
Pakhtakor
 Uzbekistan Super Cup (1): 2021,
 Uzbekistan Super League (1): 2019,
 Uzbekistan Cup (1): 2019,
 Uzbekistan League Cup (1): 2019

References

External links

 

2001 births
People from Sirdaryo Region
Living people
Uzbekistani footballers
Uzbekistan international footballers
Association football defenders
Pakhtakor Tashkent FK players
FC Bunyodkor players
FC Nizhny Novgorod (2015) players
Uzbekistan Super League players
Russian Premier League players
Uzbekistani expatriate footballers
Expatriate footballers in Russia
Uzbekistani expatriate sportspeople in Russia